Lee Youngjin is a South Korean judge. He was appointed to Justice of the Constitutional Court of Korea in 2018.

Career 
1993  Judge, Cheongju District Court
1996  Judge, Cheongju District Court Jecheon Branch
1997  Judge, Suwon District Court
2000  Judge, Seoul District Court 
2002  Judge, Seoul District Court Eastern Branch
2003  Judicial Policy Research Judge, National Court Administration
2004  Judge, Seoul High Court
2005  Judge, Judicial Policy Office, National Court Administration
2006  Judge, Seoul High Court
2008  Presiding Judge, Jeonju District Court
2009  Presiding Judge, Suwon District Court
2011  Professor, Judicial Research & Training Institute 
2012  Presiding Judge, Seoul Central District Court
2015  Presiding Judge, Busan High Court Changwon Branch
2017  Presiding Judge, Seoul High Court
2018~ Justice of the Constitutional Court of Korea (since Oct. 18, 2018)

References 

South Korean judges
1961 births
Living people
Justices of the Constitutional Court of Korea